The Forest on the Hill is a 1919 British silent crime film directed by Cecil Hepworth and starring Alma Taylor, James Carew and Gerald Ames. It was based on a novel by Eden Phillpotts.

Cast
 Alma Taylor - Drusilla Whyddon 
 James Carew - Timothy Snow 
 Gerald Ames - John Redstone 
 Lionelle Howard - Frederick Moyle 
 Eileen Dennes - Audrey Leaman 
 Gwynne Herbert - Mrs. Snow 
 Stephen Ewart - Lord Champernowne 
 John MacAndrews - Mr. Leaman 
 Judd Green - Lot Snow

References

External links

1919 films
British crime films
1919 crime films
Films directed by Cecil Hepworth
British silent feature films
Hepworth Pictures films
British black-and-white films
1910s English-language films
1910s British films